Astragalus siculus, known as the Sicilian milkvetch, is a plant endemic to Sicily.

References

siculus